A350 usually refers to the Airbus A350, a long-range widebody airliner created by Airbus.

A350 may also refer to:

 The original designation for what is now known as the Airbus A330neo
 A350 road (England), a north–south primary route in southern England
 ABM-1 Galosh or A-350 missile, a nuclear tipped anti-ballistic missile used in the former Soviet Union
 Fujifilm FinePix A350, a basic digital point and shoot camera
 DSLR-A350 aka Sony α350, a digital SLR with A-mount in the Sony Alpha camera system